Ptilopachus is an African genus of birds in the New World quail family.

Taxonomy
The genus Ptilopachus  was introduced in 1837 by the English naturalist William John Swainson to accommodate a single species, the stone partridge, which is therefore the type species. The genus name is from Ancient Greek ptilon meaning "feather" with pakhus meaning "thick" or "dense".

As traditionally defined, only the stone partridge was included in this genus, but based on genetic evidence, it now also includes  Nahan's partridge (formerly considered a francolin).  The study also concludes that this genus is more closely related to the New World quails  (Odontophoridae) and might be considered their only African representative.

Description

See also
Donacobius, the only American species of an otherwise Old World bird lineage

References

 
Bird genera